Erwin Glock (9 April 1925 – 29 June 1993) was a German sports shooter. He competed at the 1972 Summer Olympics and the 1976 Summer Olympics for West Germany. Glock won 34 West German national titles during his career. He also worked as a sports teacher, and authored books on shooting and developed a training target for shooting.

References

1925 births
1993 deaths
German male sport shooters
Olympic shooters of West Germany
Shooters at the 1972 Summer Olympics
Shooters at the 1976 Summer Olympics
Sportspeople from Heidelberg
20th-century German people